The following is a timeline of the history of the city of Huntington, West Virginia, USA.

18th century

 1775 - First permanent settlement in modern-day Huntington founded as "Holderby's Landing".

19th century
 1871
 Huntington incorporated; named after businessman Collis P. Huntington who initiated town planning.
 Peter Cline Buffington elected mayor.
 1872
 Huntington Argus newspaper begins publication.
 First Congregational Church founded.
 1873 - Chesapeake and Ohio Railway begins operating.
 1874 - Huntington Advertiser newspaper in publication.
 1880 - Population: 3,174.
 1885 - Davis Opera House built.
 1887
 Seat of Cabell County relocates to Huntington from Barboursville.
 Railroad depot built.
 1888 - Ohio River Railroad (Wheeling-Huntington) begins operating.
 1890 - Population: 10,108.
 1891 - Guyandotte becomes part of Huntington.
 1893 - "Central City" incorporated near Huntington.
 1900 - Ohio Valley Electric Railway begins operating.

20th century

 1901 - Cabell County Courthouse built.
 1903 - Carnegie Public Library opens.
 1909
 Central City becomes part of Huntington.
 Herald-Dispatch newspaper in publication.
 1910 - Population: 31,161.
 1913
 March 30: Ohio River flood.
 Ritter Park created.
 1915 - City Hall built.
 1917 - Liggett and Myers Tobacco factory built.
 1920 - Population: 50,177.
 1924 - St. Mary's Hospital opens.
 1926 - Tivoli Theatre in business.
 1927 - WSAZ radio begins broadcasting.
 1928 - Keith-Albee Theatre in business.
 1929 - World War I Memorial Arch erected.
 1930
 Rotary Park Bridge built.
 Population: 75,572.
 1935 - Flood.
 1936 - Huntington Junior College established.
 1937 - January 28: Ohio River flood of 1937 occurs.
 1941 - Beverly Theatre in business.
 1949 - WSAZ-TV television begins broadcasting.
 1950
 Veterans Memorial Fieldhouse (arena) opens.
 Population: 86,353.
 1952 - Tri-State Airport dedicated.
 1955 - WHTN-TV (television) begins broadcasting.
 1956 - Cabell Huntington Hospital opens.
 1961 - Marshall University active.
 1968 - Cabell-Wayne Historical Society founded.
 1970
 November 14: Airplane crash occurs near city; Marshall University football team among the fatalities.
 West Huntington Bridge built.
 1977
 Huntington Civic Center (arena) opens.
 University's Joan C. Edwards School of Medicine established.
 Nick Rahall becomes U.S. representative for West Virginia's 4th congressional district.
 1980 - Population: 63,684.
 1981 - Huntington Mall in business.
 1983 - Huntington Area Food Bank established.
 1984 - Harris Riverfront Park opens.
 1985
 East Huntington Bridge opens.
 City adopts "strong mayor" style of government.
 1987 - Huntington Museum of Art active.
 1993 - Owens-Illinois Glass Co. manufactory shuts down.
 1994 - Robert C. Byrd Bridge to Chesapeake, Ohio opens.
 2000 - City website online (approximate date).

21st century

 2006 - Fictional but based on true events We Are Marshall movie released (set in Huntington).
 2009 - Kim Wolfe becomes mayor.
 2010 - Population: 49,138.
 2013 - Stephen T. Williams becomes mayor.
 2015 - Evan Jenkins U.S. representative for West Virginia's 3rd congressional district.

See also
 Huntington history
 List of mayors of Huntington, West Virginia
 National Register of Historic Places listings in Cabell County, West Virginia
 Other cities in West Virginia:
 Timeline of Charleston, West Virginia
 Timeline of Wheeling, West Virginia

References

Bibliography

 
 
 
 
 
 
 George S. Wallace. Huntington through 75 Years. Huntington: 1947.
 Doris C. Miller. Centennial History of Huntington. Huntington Centennial Commission, 1971.
 James E. Casto. Huntington: An Illustrated History. Huntington: Chapman Printing, 1997.
 
 
 
 
 . Circa 2014- (Series of articles)
 James E. Casto.  Lost Huntington, Recalling Vanished Landmarks. Drummond Press. Jacksonville, Florida, 2015.

External links

 
 Items related to Huntington, various dates (via Digital Public Library of America)
  (subject guide)

Huntington, West Virginia
Huntington
West Virginia-related lists
Huntington
Years in West Virginia